Torodora bacillaris is a moth in the family Lecithoceridae. It is found in Guangdong, China.

The wingspan is 26–30 mm. The forewings are dark brown evenly, with a weak yellowish patch at two thirds of the costa. The hindwings are light brown and broader than the forewings.

Etymology
The specific name is derived from Latin bacillaris and refers to the shape of lateral lobes of juxta.

References

Moths described in 2010
Torodora